Arjun Prajapati  who born in 1957 (died 12 November 2020) was an Indian artist from Jaipur , Rajasthan, known for his pottery and Sculptures.

He had played a vital role in modern Rajasthani sculpture. He is master in cloning and known as the master of cloning .

He had made many sculptures in which his famous work is " Bani Tani " in clay .

Biography
He was born in 1957 in India. He received the Padma Shri Award in 2010. He died on 12 November 2020, in Jaipur Rajasthan due to Coronavirus.

Awards
 National Award from Ministry of textiles

 Shilp Guru 2016
 Padma Shree

See also
 Indian pottery

References

Recipients of the Padma Shri in arts
People from Rajasthan
Indian potters
1957 births
2020 deaths
Deaths from the COVID-19 pandemic in India